Lauren Weinstein may refer to:
 Lauren Weinstein (technologist), American activist concerned with matters involving technology
 Lauren Weinstein (cartoonist) (born 1975), American comic book artist
 Lauren Sager Weinstein, chief data officer at Transport for London